The Big Hill Tunnel, in North Central Victoria, Australia, was built as part of the Melbourne–Echuca railway or Bendigo line. It was commenced by the private Melbourne, Mount Alexander and Murray River Railway Company. When the company experienced financial difficulties it was taken over by the Victorian colonial government in 1856, with the Victorian Railways Department being formed to operate the new public railway system.

The line opened in five stages from February 1859 to September 1864, and was at the time the largest engineering undertaking in the Colony of Victoria. More than 6,000 men were involved in the construction of the Bendigo line with the main contractors Cornish and Bruce undertaking the works.

The line served a strategic economic need of serving the important goldfields of Castlemaine and Bendigo (then called Sandhurst), and capturing for Melbourne the trade in wool and other goods from northern Victoria and the Riverina which were formerly shipped through South Australia via the Murray River.

The  Big Hill Tunnel was the longest of the two tunnels built on the line. It is located under Big Hill between Kangaroo Flat and Ravenswood, south of Bendigo. Like the other tunnel on the line, the Elpinstone Tunnel, it was double-tracked when built, but was singled as part of the Regional Fast Rail project.

References

Tunnels in Australia
North Central Victoria
Railway tunnels in Victoria (Australia)